Janolus savinkini, common name purple-tipped janolus, is a colorful sea slug, an arminina (a suborder of Janolus) nudibranch, a marine gastropod mollusc in the family Proctonotidae. The body and caruncle of this species are yellow with a hue of light orange. The papillae and cerata are also this colour except for the tips, which are blue/purple, hence the common name. It is found in East Asian waters and is believed to be extremely rare in Okinawa.

References

 Martynov A.V. & Korshunova T.A. (2012). Opisthobranch molluscs of Vietnam (Gastropoda: Opisthobranchia). In: Britayev T.A. & Pavlov D.S. (Eds.). Benthic fauna of the Bay of Nhatrang, Southern Vietnam. Vol. 2. Moscow, KMK: 142-257

External links
 Images

Proctonotidae
Gastropods described in 2012